Wotton is a suburb of Gloucester, in the unparished area of Gloucester, in the Gloucester district, in the county of Gloucestershire, England. It is situated close to the city centre (1 mile), the Royal Hospital, the city's railway station and to London Road.

History 
The name "Wotton" means 'Wood farm/settlement', the "St Mary" part being from the church is dedicated to St. Mary de Lode. Wootton St. Mary was recorded in the Domesday Book as Cerletone.

In the Imperial Gazetteer of England and Wales (1870–72) John Marius Wilson described Wotton:

Wotton St Mary became a parish in 1866 on 1 April 1966 the parish was abolished and became part of Barnwood, Barton St. Mary, Gloucester St. Catherine, Gloucester St. John the Baptist, Longford, Matson, South Hamlet, Wotton St. Mary Within and Wotton St. Mary Without.

References

Areas of Gloucester